Gayla Reid (born 12 May 1945) is an Australian-born Canadian writer.

Biography
Born and raised in Armidale, New South Wales, Reid was educated at the University of New England, Australian National University and the University of British Columbia. Remaining in Canada, she was active in the country's feminist movement, editing the newspaper Kinesis and the literary journal Room of One's Own and teaching women's studies at Vancouver Community College.

She began publishing fiction in the early 1990s, winning the Journey Prize in 1993 for her short story "Sister Doyle's Men". In 1994, she published her first short story collection, To Be There With You, which was a winner of the Ethel Wilson Fiction Prize in 1995. All the Seas of the World and Closer Apart were finalists for the Ethel Wilson fiction prize in 2001 and 2002. Come from Afar was published to critical acclaim in 2011. According to jury citation, Gayla Reid stands out for her stunningly beautiful language and her ability to depict places such as Canada, Australia, Vietnam etc.  She also described a state of mind, an evocation of a particular character's relationship to land, people and time. Her fiction combines the poetry of language and observation with the force of highly-accomplished and compelling narrative.

Reid is represented by the Carolyn Swayze Literary Agency.

Awards
 1993, Journey Prize
 1995, Ethel Wilson Fiction Prize
 2005, Marian Engel Award

Selected bibliography
 To Be There With You. Vancouver: Douglas and McIntyre, 1994.
 All the Seas of the World. Toronto: Stoddart, 2001.  
 Closer Apart. Toronto: Stoddart, 2002. 
 Come from Afar. Toronto: Comorant, 2011.

References 

1945 births
People from Armidale
20th-century Australian novelists
20th-century Canadian novelists
21st-century Australian novelists
21st-century Canadian novelists
Australian feminist writers
Australian women novelists
Australian women short story writers
Canadian feminist writers
Canadian women novelists
Canadian women short story writers
Living people
University of New England (Australia) alumni
Australian National University alumni
University of British Columbia alumni
20th-century Canadian women writers
20th-century Canadian short story writers
21st-century Canadian short story writers
21st-century Canadian women writers
20th-century Australian women